Isuru Perera (born 15 September 1984) is a Sri Lankan cricketer. He made his first-class debut for Chilaw Marians Cricket Club in the 2005–06 Premier Trophy on 6 January 2006.

See also
 List of Chilaw Marians Cricket Club players

References

External links
 

1984 births
Living people
Sri Lankan cricketers
Chilaw Marians Cricket Club cricketers
Place of birth missing (living people)